The City of Birmingham Tramways Company Ltd  operated trams in Birmingham, England, from 1896 until 1911.
 
The company was formed on 29 September 1896 by James Ross (President and Vice-President of the Toronto and Montreal Street Railway Co. of Canada) and Sir William Mackenzie  to take over the business of the Birmingham Central Tramways Company Ltd.

The last routes in Birmingham closed on 31 December 1911. Most of its services were taken over by Birmingham Corporation Tramways.

Historical overview
City of Birmingham Tramways Company Ltd was the result of a number of changes in ownership of the tramway franchises within the city of Birmingham since its creation in 1872 until 1911.

The Birmingham and District Tramways Company Ltd (BDTC) operated trams in Birmingham from 1872 until 1876. BDTC was acquired by the Birmingham Tramways and Omnibus Company Ltd (BTOC) in 1876.

BTOC in turn was taken over by the Birmingham Central Tramways Company Ltd (BCTC) in 1886. In 1896 the assets of the BCTC were acquired by the CBTC.

On 1 January 1907, some of CBTC’s Birmingham routes were taken over by BCT. On 1 January 1912 BCT took over the remainder of the company's routes, ownership of which had just passed from neighbouring local councils to Birmingham Corporation.

Detailed history

Birmingham and District Tramways Company Ltd
BDTC was the tramway company operating in Birmingham from 1872 until 1876.

The company was formed by William Busby and Daniel Busby in 1871 as an amalgamation of the Birmingham and Staffordshire Tramways Company Ltd and the Birmingham Tramways Company Ltd.

It built a standard gauge tramway line in 1872 from Hockley Brook to Dudley Port operated by horse trams. In 1873 the service was extended to the centre of Birmingham over the Birmingham Corporation tracks which were leased for £910 over seven years. The Birmingham Corporation tracks had cost £15,000 to build.

In 1874 the tramway between West Bromwich and Dudley Port was abandoned as the company was in financial difficulty.

The company was taken over by the Birmingham Tramways and Omnibus Company Ltd in 1876.

Birmingham Tramways and Omnibus Company Ltd
BTOC operated trams in Birmingham from 1876 until 1886.

It took over the business of the Birmingham and District Tramways Company Ltd and restricted the trams to a service between Birmingham and Handsworth, thus discontinuing the service through West Bromwich.

It was taken over by the BCTC in 1886.

Birmingham Central Tramways Company Ltd

The BCTC operated trams in Birmingham from 1884 to 1896.

The company was formed in 1882, initially as the Birmingham Suburban Tramways Company but by the time of the opening of its first line, had been renamed the Birmingham Central Tramways Company Ltd.

The initial rolling stock consisted of 10 Falcon horse cars for the Nechells route, 14 Kitson steam tram locos and 13 Falcon trailer cars.

In 1886 they purchased the track of the BTOC, which lay outside the city boundary, and 18 horse cars. At the same time Birmingham Corporation leased the lines within the city to the Company.

Taken over by companies controlled by Scottish-Canadian businessman James Ross, on 24 March 1888, the horse tram route from Colmore Row to Hockley Brook was converted to cable traction by the Patent Cable Tramway Company, and on 20 April 1889, the line was extended to Handsworth (New Inns). The service was operated with open-top double-decker cars.

In October 1889 the portion of the acquired tramway along Bristol Road to Bournbrook was closed for reconstruction. It re-opened on 24 July 1890 and was worked by Nos. 101-112, Falcon battery-electric (accumulator) open-top double-deck cars.

On 29 September 1896 the assets of the BCTC were acquired by the City of Birmingham Tramways Company Ltd.

The City of Birmingham Tramways Company Ltd

The CBTC operated trams in Birmingham from 1896 until 1911.
 
The company was formed on 29 September 1896 by James Ross and William Mackenzie to take over the business of the BCTC.

From 14 May 1901 the route from the city to Bournbrook via Bristol Road (later extended to Selly Oak) was operated by electric cars using overhead current supply. Other routes were soon electrified and the company became a British Electric Traction subsidiary in 1902.

On 30 June 1902 the company took over the routes of the Birmingham and Aston Tramways Company which were now owned by Aston Manor Urban District Council. By this date the CBTC were operating 21 overhead electric trams, 54 cable trams, 89 steam engines, 76 Double Decker steam trams, 10 horse cars, 45 horse buses and 608 horses on tracks mostly constructed and owned by Birmingham Corporation.

The last routes in Birmingham closed on 31 December 1911. Most of its services were taken over by Birmingham Corporation Tramways.

See also 
 1907 Birmingham Tramway accident

References

External links 

 Remembering Birmingham’s Trams - online exhibition by the National Tramway Museum 

Transport in Birmingham, West Midlands
Birmingham
Transport companies established in 1896
3 ft 6 in gauge railways in England
Transport companies disestablished in 1911
1896 establishments in England
1911 disestablishments in England
British companies disestablished in 1911
British companies established in 1896